Carinoma is a genus of worms belonging to the family Carinomidae.

The genus has almost cosmopolitan distribution.

Species:

Carinoma armandi 
Carinoma caraibica 
Carinoma coei
Carinoma hamanako 
Carinoma mutabilis 
Carinoma patagonica 
Carinoma patriciae 
Carinoma renieri 
Carinoma sachalinica 
Carinoma tremaphoros 
Carinoma uschakovi

References

Nemerteans